Fred W. Farren was an English professional footballer who played as a left back.

Career
Farren played for Kettering Town, Bradford City and Halifax Town. For Bradford City, he made 87 appearances in the Football League; he also made 8 FA Cup appearances.

Sources

References

Year of birth missing
Year of death missing
English footballers
Kettering Town F.C. players
Bradford City A.F.C. players
Halifax Town A.F.C. players
English Football League players
Association football fullbacks